Andrew Bruce Harvey is a Canadian politician, who was elected to the Legislative Assembly of New Brunswick in the 2014 provincial election. He represented the electoral district of Carleton-Victoria as a member of the Liberal Party until his defeat in the 2020 New Brunswick general election.

Harvey was named to the Select Committee on Cannabis, pursuant to Motion 31 of the 3rd session of the 58th New Brunswick Legislature.

References

Living people
Members of the Executive Council of New Brunswick
New Brunswick Liberal Association MLAs
21st-century Canadian politicians
Year of birth missing (living people)